Ronald Lee Singleton (born April 15, 1952 in New Orleans, Louisiana) is a former American football offensive tackle in the National Football League. He was drafted by the San Diego Chargers in the fourth round of the 1976 NFL Draft. He played college football at Grambling State. He is mentioned in The Blind Side, by Michael Lewis.

1952 births
Living people
American football offensive tackles
Grambling State Tigers football players
San Diego Chargers players
San Francisco 49ers players